William Addis Fagan (15 December 1832 – 14 March 1890) was an Irish Liberal politician.

He was elected as the Member of Parliament (MP) for Carlow Borough at the 1868 general election but stood down at the next general election, in 1874.

At some point, Fagan was also Captain of the 12th Royal Lancers.

Family
Fagan was the son of Cork City MP William Trant Fagan. In 1832, he married Frances Mahony, daughter of Daniel Mahony, and together they had two children: Maureen Elizabeth Fagan (born 1875), and William Charles Trant Fagan (born 1877).

References

External links
 

1832 births
1890 deaths
Irish Liberal Party MPs
Members of the Parliament of the United Kingdom for County Carlow constituencies (1801–1922)
UK MPs 1868–1874
12th Royal Lancers officers